The Third-Party Taxi Booking Service Providers Act 2015 is a statute of the Parliament of Singapore that makes it necessary for third-party taxi booking services that have more than 20 participating taxis, to register with the Land Transport Authority (LTA) in order to operate in Singapore. The law requires the service providers to adhere to guidelines such as specifying fares and surcharges to commuters upfront, dispatching only licensed taxis and drivers, and providing LTA with live data on bookings.

Overview

The Third-Party Taxi Booking Service Providers Act is passed as a light-touch approach in protecting commuter interest and safety while regulating third-party taxi booking services. New service providers must obtain a certificate of registration before they can operate in Singapore. Taxi-booking fees charged by service providers cannot exceed those charged by taxi companies. Taxi-booking service providers that violate the regulatory framework may be liable to penalties of up to $100,000 per contravention.

The Act also caters for additional measures:
 Destinations are optional while making bookings with third-party taxi booking services
 Bidding and pre-trip tipping by passengers are forbidden
 Third-party taxi booking services and apps must display all vehicle types, surcharges, prices, and booking fees clearly

Uses of the Act

As of 2016, taxi booking apps such as GrabTaxi and Hailo have been issued a certificate that allows them to operate in Singapore for a period of three years from 1 December 2015.

See also
Lui Tuck Yew

References

External links
 Third-Party Taxi Booking Service Providers Act 2015

2015 in law
2015 in Singapore
Singaporean legislation
Taxis of Singapore